State Route 9 (SR 9) is a west-to-east state highway in the U.S. state of Tennessee that is  long. It begins in Campbell County and ends in Cocke County. SR 9 is little-known by the general public by this designation as it is overlain by U.S. Route 25W and U.S. Route 25 east of Newport; the "9" designation is seen on mileposts. The entire route is located in East Tennessee. Despite running concurrent with a North-South US Route, Route 9 is signed as east-west.

Route description

Cocke County

SR 9 begins as a primary highway in Cocke County at North Carolina-Tennessee state line near Del Rio, concurrent with US 25/US 70. US 25/US 70/SR 9 then goes through some curves and cross French Broad River via the Wolf Creek Bridge. They then begin running along the north bank of the French Broad and intersect and become concurrent with SR 107 and then enter Del Rio, where SR 107 separates. US 25/US 70/SR 9 continue northwest to intersect SR 340 before leaving Del Rio. They then cross the French Broad again and before entering Newport and leaving The French Broad and crossing the Pigeon River. In Newport, they intersect SR 73 before entering downtown. In downtown, they intersect and become concurrent with US 321 and SR 35. US 321 separates shortly afterwards at the intersection with SR 32, where US 321 goes south on SR 32 and SR 32 joins the concurrency. US 25/US 70/SR 9/SR 35 then leave downtown and come to where US 25 splits into US 25W and US 25E. Here, SR 32 goes north on US 25E and US 70/SR 9/SR 35 continue on US 25W. The concurrency then has a full interchange with I-40 (Exit 432 A/B) before US 411/SR 35 separate and turn south. When US 411 meets its northern terminus, SR 9 becomes secondary; US 25W/US 70/SR 9 then leave Newport and cross into Jefferson County.

Jefferson County

Immediately after crossing the line, they intersect SR 363 in Reidtown. They then cross Douglas Lake, parallel to the I-40 bridge. Immediately after crossing the lake, they intersect SR 113. The highway now enters Dandridge and SR 66 joins the concurrency. US 25W/US 70/SR 9/SR 66 then intersect and become concurrent with SR 92, passing by downtown to the north and SR 66 becoming unsigned at this intersection. They then separate from SR 92 and have another interchange with I-40 (Exit 415), with SR 66 separating and having an unsigned concurrency with I-40 west before leaving Dandridge. US 25W/US 70/SR 9 continue west through rural Jefferson County before coming to an intersection with Snyder Road (which connects to SR 66 and Sevierville) and SR 139, becoming concurrent with SR 139 before crossing into Sevier County.

Sevier County

Once across the line, SR 139 separates and turns south towards Kodak, and US 25W/US 70/SR 9 continue west to cross into Knox County.

Knox County

The highway then has an interchange with US 11E/SR 34 in Carter (also known as Trentville), with US 11E joining the concurrency as they enter Knoxville. SR 9 becomes primary once again at this intersection. US 11E/US 25W/US 70/SR 9 then intersect SR 168 (Governor John Sevier Highway) before crossing a bridge over the Holston River and having another interchange with I-40 (Exit 394), where SR 9 and US 25W run concurrent with the interstate for a short ways before concurrent with I-640 (Exit 385). They then have interchanges with Mall Road/Washington Pike/Millertown Pike (Exit 8), US 441/SR 33/SR 331 (Broadway, which provides access to Fountain City, Exit 6), and I-75/I-275 (Exit 3A) before separating and US 25W/SR 9 turns north (Exit 3B). US 25W/SR 9 continue through the North Knoxville neighborhood, along Clinton Highway, and then leave Knoxville to enter Powell. In Powell, they intersect and have a short concurrency with SR 131 before leaving Powell and crossing into Anderson County.

Anderson County

The highway then enters Claxton and becomes a very curvy 4-lane undivided highway. In Claxton, US 25W/SR 9 intersects SR 170, then continues north and leaves Claxton and winds its way through rural areas for a few miles to enter Clinton. In Clinton, they intersect SR 61 before going straight through the historic downtown as Main Street and SR 9 once again becomes secondary. US 25W/SR 9 then leave Clinton and become curvy again before going through Medford to enter Rocky Top (Lake City). In Rocky Top, US 25W/SR 9 go through downtown and intersect and become concurrent with SR 116. The highway intersects US 441/SR 71 (which provides access to Norris Lake and Norris Dam) before coming to an interchange and US 25W/SR 9 becomes concurrent with I-75 (Exit 129), with SR 116 taking over the old route of US 25W/SR 9.

Campbell County

They then cross into Campbell County and enter Caryville, where they separate from I-75 (Exit 134) and become concurrent with SR 63; SR 9 becomes a primary highway. Immediately afterward, they intersect the northern end of SR 116 and pass by Cove Lake, Cove Lake State Park, and Caryville Dam before leaving Caryville and entering Jacksboro. In Jacksboro, US 25W/SR 9/SR 63 bypass downtown to the north and go through Jacksboro's main business area. The highway now crosses into La Follette, where they go straight through downtown and then US 25W/SR 9 separate from SR 63 and leave La Follette, where SR 9 becomes a secondary route for the rest of its duration and becomes very curvy again as the road enters mountainous terrain. It then passes through Duff and Habersham before passing through Morley and intersecting SR 90. US 25W/SR 9 finally enter Jellico and have another interchange with I-75 (Exit 160). They then enter downtown and intersect SR 297 before turning north and ending at the Kentucky state line, with US 25W continuing north alone into Kentucky.

Counties traversed
State Route 9 traverses the counties shown in the table below.

Major intersections

See also
List of Tennessee state highways

References
Tennessee Department of Transportation (24 January 2003). "State Highway and Interstate List 2003".

External links
Tennessee Department of Transportation

009
Transportation in Campbell County, Tennessee
Transportation in Anderson County, Tennessee
Transportation in Knox County, Tennessee
Transportation in Knoxville, Tennessee
Transportation in Sevier County, Tennessee
Transportation in Jefferson County, Tennessee
Transportation in Cocke County, Tennessee